Dobrescu is a Romanian surname, derived from the first name Dobrin. Notable people with the surname include:

 Bogdan A. Dobrescu (born 1968), physicist
 Constantin Dobrescu-Argeș (1856–1903), politician and peasant activist
 Dem I. Dobrescu (1869–1948), mayor of Bucharest (1929–1934) and political activist
 Dimitrie Dobrescu (1852–1934), mayor of Bucharest (1911–1912), conservative politician
 Emilian Dobrescu (born 1933), economist
 Liliana Dobrescu (born 1971), swimmer
 Mihai Bogdan Dobrescu (born 1976), boxer
 Mircea Dobrescu (born 1930), boxer
 Nicolae Dobrescu (1874–1914), church historian

References

See also
 Dobre (disambiguation)
 Dobra (disambiguation)
 Dobrin (disambiguation)
 Dobrușa (disambiguation)
 Dobrești (disambiguation)
 Dobrotești (disambiguation)

Romanian-language surnames